Christian Burgess (born 24 April 1994) is a Bermudian cricketer. Burgess is a left-handed batsman who plays as a wicket-keeper.

Burgess made his debut for Bermuda in 2010 in a first-class match in the Intercontinental Shield against the United Arab Emirates at the National Stadium, Hamilton. He batted twice in the match, ending each innings not out without scoring, with Bermuda losing the match by 9 wickets. Immediately following this match, he made his debut in List A cricket, playing two matches in that format against the United Arab Emirates, scoring 25 runs with a high score of 16. He then played in two Twenty20 matches against the same opposition.

References

External links
Christian Burgess at ESPNcricinfo
Christian Burgess at CricketArchive

1994 births
Living people
Bermudian cricketers
Wicket-keepers